Bud Dajo, is a cinder cone and the second highest point (+600m) in the province of Sulu, Philippines. it is one of the cinder cones that make up the island of Jolo and part of the Jolo Volcanic Group in the Republic of the Philippines. The mountain and adjacent lands were declared as Mount Dajo National Park in 1938. It is a sacred mountain for the locals, and the Tausug people at-large, as well as nearby ethnic groups.

Physical features
On the summit of the mountain is  crater that is breached to the southwest. The other volcanic edifices adjacent to Bud Dajo are: Matanding, located northeast of the Bud Dajo with an elevation of  asl; Guimba, east and elevation of  asl; and Sungal, southeast which is  asl., dangerous volcano.

Geology
The basaltic volcanic cone is part of Zamboanga-Sulu volcanic arc.

Eruptions falsely attributed to the mountain

1641
Two volcanoes falsely attributed to the eruption on January 4, 1641, which engulfed southern Philippines in darkness. Further studies later found the eruption to have come from Mount Melibengoy in Cotabato province.

1897
The earthquake and subsequent tsunami on September 21, 1897, that devastated the Southern Philippines was believed to be from a submarine eruption therefore excludes Bud Dajo.

PHIVOLCS monitoring activity
A short-term monitoring (seismic and visuals) surveys were conducted by the Philippine Institute of Volcanology and Seismology in 1993 and in 1997 on the mountain.  No unusual activities were observed within the vicinity of the volcano.

Mount Dajo National Park

The mountain and surrounding areas were declared as a national park by Proclamation No. 261 on February 28, 1938, encompassing  of land.  Recent reports have shown that the mountain is very deforested with few remaining forest cover usually on the steep ridges.  The game refuge is not currently listed as a protected area under the National Integrated Protected Areas System (NIPAS) of the Department of Environment and Natural Resources.

Fauna
Some vulnerable and endangered species, not necessarily endemic to the area, but can be found within the Mount Dajo National Park are (from BirdLife International): 
 Grey imperial pigeon (Ducula pickeringii), Vulnerable
 Philippine cockatoo or the red-vented cockatoo (Cacatua haematuropygia), Critically endangered
 Sulu hornbill (Anthracoceros montani),	Critically endangered
 Sulu pygmy woodpecker Dendrocopos ramsayi, Vulnerable
 Winchell's kingfisher or rufous-lored kingfisher (Todiramphus winchelli), Vulnerable

Historical relevance
The mountain was the site of the First Battle of Bud Dajo during the Moro Rebellion of the Philippine–American War in 1906, which culminated in the killing by U.S. forces of over 800-900 villagers, mostly civilians, hiding on the crater of Bud Dajo. The event is known as the Moro Crater Massacre. The killings, which disrespected the mountain and the spirits, caused massive outrage among the native people as Bud Dajo is a sacred site. The five-day Second Battle of Bud Dajo in 1911 ended with fewer casualties through negotiations, persuading the majority to return home.

See also
List of active volcanoes in the Philippines
List of potentially active volcanoes in the Philippines
List of inactive volcanoes in the Philippines
List of national parks of the Philippines

References

External links
Bud Dajo on the Philippine Institute of Volcanology and Seismology (PHIVOLCS) site
Jolo at Smithsonian Institution's Global Volcanism Program
What happened at Bud Dajo

Active volcanoes of the Philippines
Volcanic crater lakes
Volcanoes of Mindanao
National parks of the Philippines
Protected areas established in 1938
Landforms of Sulu